Night at the Golden Eagle is a 2001 American crime drama film written and directed by Adam Rifkin. The low-budget film was a box office bomb, earning about $18,000 against a budget of $1 million.

Plot
Two elderly criminals spend their final night in Los Angeles, California at the Golden Eagle Hotel prior to their departure to Las Vegas, Nevada, to lead a life without crime. Unfortunately, on the hottest night of the summer, these two ex-criminals seemingly get caught in the malice of prostitutes, pimps, drunken bums, fighting monkeys, and young runaways.

Cast
 Donnie Montemarano – Tommy
 Vinny Argiro – Mick
 Natasha Lyonne – Amber
 Vinnie Jones – Rodan
 Ann Magnuson – Sally
 Nicole Jacobs – Loriann
 Fayard Nicholas – Mr. Maynard
 Sam Moore – Sylvester
 Badja Djola – Gabriel
 Kitten Natividad – Ruby
 Ron Jeremy – Ray
 James Caan – Prison warden (uncredited)
 Bunny Summers – waitress
 Adam Rifkin – Man in Private Booth (uncredited)

References

External links
 
 

2001 films
2001 crime drama films
Shangri-La Entertainment films
American crime drama films
Films scored by Tyler Bates
Films directed by Adam Rifkin
2000s English-language films
2000s American films